Nuyts Reef Conservation Park is a protected area in the Australian state of South Australia associated with  Nuyts Reef, which is located off the state's west coast in the Great Australian Bight about  west south-west of Fowlers Bay.  

The land forming the conservation park  was declared a Fauna Conservation Reserve on 16 March 1967. This was reconstituted as Nuyts Reef Conservation Park on 27 April 1972 under the National Parks and Wildlife Act 1972 to "conserve Australian sea lion breeding habitat". On 19 December 1991, additional land was added to the conservation park to extend protection over land located between high tide and low tide.

In 1980, the conservation park was described as follows:
A group of five small reefs supporting an Australian sea lion colony and providing breeding habitat for seabirds... Five small granite reefs and rocks, some of which are swept by storm waves. The Reefs are without vegetative cover... Isolation and the absence of introduced species has ensured habitat preservation. 

The conservation park including its marine zone is classified as an International Union for Conservation of Nature (IUCN) Category Ia protected area.   In 1980, it was listed on the now-defunct Register of the National Estate.

References

External links
The Nuyts Reef Conservation Park webpage on the Protected Planet website

Conservation parks of South Australia
South Australian terrestrial protected areas with a marine zone
Protected areas established in 1967
1967 establishments in Australia
South Australian places listed on the defunct Register of the National Estate
Great Australian Bight